is the ninth studio album by the American electronic musician Vektroid under the alias Macintosh Plus, released on December 9, 2011 by the independent record label Beer on the Rug. It is her ninth full-length album and was one of the first releases of the 2010s microgenre known as vaporwave to gain popular recognition on the Internet. Since then, Floral Shoppe has been considered by some critics to be the defining album of the style.

Background and composition
The album is frequently cited as an example of the then-emerging Internet-based vaporwave subgenre, along with works from other artists released by the record label Beer on the Rug. Prior to Floral Shoppe, Ramona Andra Xavier had previously produced other releases under multiple pseudonyms, including Vektroid, Laserdisc Visions, dstnt, and New Dreams Ltd. Adam Harper of Dummy, in an article about the vaporwave culture, described the album's content as "chopped, glitching and screwed adult contemporary soul alongside twinkling spa promotional tunes."

Xavier takes an unorthodox approach to sampling throughout Floral Shoppe, with "voices slowed to wordless drawls, tempos abused at whim, [and] snippets mashed over each other at clashing time signatures."

The album's second track, "リサフランク420 / 現代のコンピュー" (Lisa Frank 420 / Modern Computing), has become nearly synonymous with the term "vaporwave" within popular discourse. The song currently has over 20 million views on YouTube.

Release
Floral Shoppe was released digitally to Vektroid's Bandcamp music store on December 9, 2011 by the independent record label Beer on the Rug. It received considerable online popularity, eventually becoming "the most hyped vaporwave release on the Internet."

Vektroid later launched a line of tank tops and hoodies sporting a variation of the Floral Shoppe album cover.

Reception
Floral Shoppe was met with polarizing reception from critics and casual listeners alike, being equally "criticized and acclaimed for [Xavier's] soulless take on muzak". Jonathan Dean of Tiny Mix Tapes wrote positively of Floral Shoppe, citing the album as "one of the best single documents of the vaporwave scene yet, a series of estranged but soulful manipulations of found audio that carefully constructs its own meditative headspace through the careful accretion of defamiliarized memory triggers." YouTube music critic Anthony Fantano's review of the album has been credited with establishing the album as a representative album of the vaporwave subgenre, and also as being a pivotal moment in the decline of the subgenre as a whole. Fantano reviewed the album negatively, rating it 4/10 and concluding "certainly it sounds nice, it has style, but there's really not much there in terms of how it's assembled". In a 2019 video "10 Times I Changed My Opinion On Albums Pt. 2", Fantano reiterated feelings that the execution of the album was unsophisticated, but noted its influence on later developments in the vaporwave genre, and opined that the songs on the album have "artistic merit independent of the songs actually being sampled".

On the year-end annual Pazz & Jop critics' poll for albums, administered by The Village Voice, the album received two votes. Perfect Sound Forevers Miles Bowe cited Floral Shoppe as one of his year-end best albums. It was also named the sixth-best album of the year by Tiny Mix Tapes, with reviewer James Parker opining that it "slid seamlessly between pure pop pleasure and the ironic framing of that pleasure, the presence of the artist at turns barely noticeable and dramatically foregrounded." Assessing the influence of Floral Shoppe on vaporwave, along with the genre's perceived decline, Parker wrote:

Legacy
Floral Shoppe has since been heralded as one of the most significant albums in the early days of vaporwave. In a retrospective review, Adam Downer of Sputnikmusic characterized the album as "constantly—and delightfully—unsettling" and "a beautiful record that's both warm and strange, nostalgic and futuristic, bizarre and totally simple." Writing for Pitchfork, Miles Bowe concluded, "Nothing could change or improve its sound which, even after thousands of soundalikes, has lost none of its perception-shattering power." Vice (Noisey) included Floral Shoppe on their ranking of the 100 best albums of the 2010s.

Track listing

Notes
 "Lisa Frank 420 / Modern Computing" is sometimes translated as "The Computing of Lisa Frank / Contemporary 420"

References

External links
 Floral Shoppe on Bandcamp
 Original Bandcamp release (under the Beer on the Rug label)
 Floral Shoppe on Internet Archive

2011 albums
Vektroid albums
Internet memes
Collage film
Vaporwave albums